The 2002–03 Barys Astana season was the 4th season of the franchise.

Kazakhstan Hockey Championship
Source: PassionHockey.com

Standings

References

Barys Astana seasons
Barys
Barys